Hydroginella musorstomi is a species of sea snail, a marine gastropod mollusc in the family Marginellidae, the margin snails.

Description
The length of the shell attains 8 mm.

Distribution
This marine species occurs off Fiji.

References

 Boyer, F., Wakefield, A., McCleery, T., 2003. The genus Hydroginella (Caenogastropoda: Marginellidae) at bathyal levels from the Fiji Islands. Novapex 4(2-3): 67-77

Marginellidae
Gastropods described in 2003